The Sammies are annual awards given by the British Sandwich Association to sandwich manufacturers and retailers.

Winners
Though there are many awards, the main ones are included below.

BSA Award
The BSA award is given for outstanding achievement to the development of the sandwich industry.
1995: Marks & Spencer
1996: Pret a Manger
1997: Edward Gibson (Gibsons)
1998: The Earl of Sandwich
1999: Peter and John Bartlett (Breadwinner)
2000: Julian Metcalfe and Sinclair Beecham (Pret a Manger)
2001: Hans Blakmann
2002: Jim Winship (BSA)
2003: Patrick Simpson (Foodservice Centre)
2004: Robin Birley (Birley's)
2005: Nigel Hunter (Buckingham Foods)
2006: Phillip Brown (founder of Philpott's)
2007: David Samworth (Samworth Brothers)

Sandwich Manufacturer of the Year
Given to the manufacturer that has made the most technical progress over the year.
1995: Joint winners: Toft Foods and Walkers Bradgate Bakery
1996: Joint winners: Toft Foods and Walkers Bradgate Bakery
1997: Breadwinner Foods
1998: Joint winners: Walkers Bradgate Bakery and Gibsons
1999: Bradgate Bakery
2000: The Sandwich Company
2001: Brambles Foods
2002: Joint winners:Bradgate Bakery and Freshway Foods
2003: Benjy's
2004: Buckingham Foods
2005: Melton Foods
2006: Freshway Foods
2007: Bradgate Bakery
2010: Raynor Foods

Sandwich Retailer of the Year
Given to the retailer who has done the most to promote sandwich sales.
1995: Tesco
1996: Tesco
1997: Tesco
1998: Marks & Spencer
1999: Boots
2000: Marks & Spencer
2001: Spar
2002: Marks & Spencer
2003: Marks & Spencer
2004: Boots
2005: Marks & Spencer
2006: Marks & Spencer
2007: J. Sainsbury

References

External links 
 

British sandwiches
British awards
Food and drink awards